Copelatus nigropennis is a species of diving beetle. It is part of the genus Copelatus in the subfamily Copelatinae of the family Dytiscidae. It was described by Zimmermann in 1927.

References

nigropennis
Beetles described in 1927